Whitchurch Rural is a civil parish in Shropshire, England.  It contains 15 listed buildings that are recorded in the National Heritage List for England.  Of these, two are listed at Grade II*, the middle of the three grades, and the others are at Grade II, the lowest grade.  The parish is to the south and east of the town of Whitchurch, and contains a number of villages and smaller settlements, including Alkington, and is otherwise rural.  The listed buildings consist of houses and farmhouses, two churches, and a pair of limekilns.


Key

Buildings

See also
Listed buildings in Whitchurch Urban

References

Citations

Sources

Lists of buildings and structures in Shropshire